D104, D. 104, or D-104 may refer to:

D104 road, a road in Croatia
D-104 microphone, a microphone commonly used in broadcasting
D. 104, The Symphony No. 1 by Louis Moreau Gottschalk